Kuzhalmannam (Coyalmannam, Kozhalmannam) may refer to

Kuzhalmannam-I, a village in Palakkad district, Kerala, India
Kuzhalmannam-II, a village in Palakkad district, Kerala, India
Kuzhalmannam (gram panchayat), a gram panchayat serving the above villages